The Charles Wood House is a historic house at 30 Chestnut Street in Stoneham, Massachusetts. It is one of the most elaborate Italianate houses in Stoneham. The -story wood-frame house was built  1875 for Charles Wood, who lived there until the first decade of the 20th century. Its basic plan is an L shape, but there is a projecting section on the center of the main facade that includes a flat-roof third-story turret, and the roof line has numerous gables facing different directions. There are porches on the front right, and in the crook of the L, with Stick style decorations, the cornice features heavy paired brackets, some of its windows are narrow rounded windows in a somewhat Gothic Revival style, and the walls are clad in several types and shapes of wooden clapboards and shingles.

The house was listed on the National Register of Historic Places in 1984, where it is listed at 30 Chestnut Street.  The property is also a contributing resource to the Nobility Hill Historic District, listed in 1990.

See also
National Register of Historic Places listings in Stoneham, Massachusetts
National Register of Historic Places listings in Middlesex County, Massachusetts

References

Houses in Stoneham, Massachusetts
Houses on the National Register of Historic Places in Stoneham, Massachusetts
Italianate architecture in Massachusetts
Houses completed in 1875
Historic district contributing properties in Massachusetts